Manuel Quintas de Almeida (1957 – 26 December 2006) was a lieutenant in the military of São Tomé and Príncipe.

15 August 1995 
He led a coup against the democratically elected government of President Miguel Trovoada on 15 August 1995. 

However, he relinquished power on 21 August as part of an agreement.

Background
In the 1970s, Almeida was a member of the MLSTP party youth. He was trained in surface artillery at the Escola Comandante Benedito in Luanda, Angola (1978) and later became a member of ex-Head of State Manuel Pinto da Costa's presidential guard.

Death
During a stay in Portugal, he died on 26 December 2006 from unspecified health reasons.

References

 

Heads of state of São Tomé and Príncipe
São Tomé and Príncipe military personnel
São Tomé and Príncipe Roman Catholics
Leaders who took power by coup
1957 births
2006 deaths
Movement for the Liberation of São Tomé and Príncipe/Social Democratic Party politicians
20th-century São Tomé and Príncipe politicians